Ireland was represented by 24 athletes at the 2012 European Athletics Championships hold in Helsinki, Finland, between 26 June - 1 July 2012.

Results

Men

Track

Women

Track

Field

Sources
 

Nations at the 2012 European Athletics Championships
Ireland at the European Athletics Championships
European Athletics Championships